The following pages detail more information about 1929 in the arts:

1929 in art
1929 in film
1929 in literature
1929 in poetry
1929 in television
1929 in radio
1929 in music
1929 in architecture

Arts